Kulangara Paulo Hormis (18 October 1917  26 January 1988) was an Indian banker and lawyer, who is the founder of Federal Bank Limited. He was born on 18 October 1917 at Mookkannoor; a small village in the suburbs of Greater Cochin in a traditional agrarian family. He initially started his professional journey as a Lawyer in the Munisiff Court of Perumbavoor. He took over the management of Travancore Federal Bank on 30 December 1944 and until 18 May 1945 Travancore Federal Bank Limited functioned at Nedumpuram under his chairmanship.

The Federal Bank Limited is a major private sector commercial bank headquartered at Aluva, Kochi, Kerala. As on 31 March 2016, Federal Bank has 1,253 branches, 1,680 ATMs and 212 CDMs (Cash Deposit Machines) across the country.

References

1917 births
1988 deaths
Indian bankers
Federal Bank